Fallen may refer to:

People
 Carl Fredrik Fallén (1764–1830), Swedish botanist and entomologist
 Gabriel Toledo (born 1991), known as FalleN, Brazilian Counter-Strike player

Arts, entertainment, and media

Fictional entities
 Fallen (Transformers), a fictional character in the Transformers universes

Films
 Fallen (1998 film), a 1998 film starring Denzel Washington, John Goodman, and Donald Sutherland
 Fallen (2016 film), a 2016 film starring Addison Timlin, Jeremy Irvine, and Harrison Gilbertson
 Fallen (film series), an American film series starring Gerard Butler

Literature
 Fallen (George novel), a 2004 crime novel by Kathleen George
 Fallen (Kate novel), a 2009 young adult fantasy novel by Lauren Kate
 Fallen (Slaughter novel), a 2011 crime novel by Karin Slaughter

Music

Albums
 Fallen (Burzum album), 2011
 Fallen (Evanescence album), 2003
 Fallen (Fields of the Nephilim album), 2002
 Fallen (For My Pain album), 2003
 Fallen (Stryper album), 2015
 Fallen (Tweak album), 2005

Songs
 "Fallen" (Mýa song), 2003
 "Fallen" (Sarah McLachlan song), 2003
 "Fallen" (Toyah song)
 "Fallen" (Vib Gyor song), 2006
 "Fallen" (Volbeat song), 2010
 "Fallen", a song by 30 Seconds to Mars from 30 Seconds to Mars
 "Fallen", a song by Heaven Shall Burn from the 2013 album Veto
 "Fallen", a song by Jaden Smith
 "Fallen", a song by Jason Derülo from Jason Derülo
 "Fallen", a song by Lauren Wood
 "Fallen", a song by Seether from Finding Beauty In Negative Spaces
 "Fallen", a song by Symphony X from the 2000 album V: The New Mythology Suite

Television

Series
 Fallen (British TV series), a 2004 made for television UK drama serial starring Jonathan Cake and Simone Lahbib, directed by Omar Madha
 Fallen (miniseries), a 2006 made for television miniseries starring Paul Wesley, directed by Mikael Salomon
"Fallen" is the finale of Apple TV 2019-2023 psychological show Servant

Episodes
 "Fallen" (Stargate SG-1) an episode of the science-fiction series Stargate SG-1
 "Fallen" (Transformers episode), an episode of the Transformers Cybertron series
 "Fallen", a CSI: Miami (season 9) episode
 "Fallen", the pilot episode of the TV series Whistler

Other uses
 Fallen angel
 Fallen Footwear, the footwear brand that sponsors skateboarder Jamie Thomas

See also

 
 
 Fall (disambiguation)
 Fallen arches (disambiguation)
 Falling (disambiguation)
 The Fallen (disambiguation)
 Faller (surname)
 Falen (disambiguation)